Yuriy Komyahin (born 6 May 1984) is a professional Ukrainian football midfielder who currently plays for FC Myr Hornostayivka in the Ukrainian Second League.

Komyahin is a product of the Republican College of Physical Culture.

Honours
SC Kakhovka
 Ukrainian football championship among amateurs: 2002, 2004
 Kherson Oblast football championship: 2002, 2004

References

External links
 
 
 Profile at the Professional Football League of Ukraine
 Profile at the Ukrainian Premier League
 Profile at ukr-football.org.ua
 

1984 births
Living people
People from Kakhovka
Piddubny Olympic College alumni
Ukrainian footballers
FC Krystal Kherson players
FC Kakhovka players
FC Hirnyk-Sport Horishni Plavni players
FC Desna Chernihiv players
FC Desna-2 Chernihiv players
MFC Mykolaiv players
FC Bastion Illichivsk players
FC Zimbru Chișinău players
FC Enerhiya Nova Kakhovka players
FC Myr Hornostayivka players
Ukrainian First League players
Ukrainian Second League players
Ukrainian expatriate footballers
Expatriate footballers in Moldova
Ukrainian expatriate sportspeople in Moldova
Association football midfielders
Sportspeople from Kherson Oblast